Olfersia is a genus of biting flies in the family of louse flies, Hippoboscidae. The genus was erected by William Elford Leach in 1817. There are seven known species, and all are parasites of birds.

Distribution
Olfersia are found worldwide with the exception of Australia, but are most abundant in North and Central America.

Systematics
Genus Olfersia Leach, 1817
Species group 'a'
O. sordida Bigot, 1885
Species group 'b'
O. bisulcata Macquart, 1847
O. fossulata Macquart, 1843
O. fumipennis (J. Sahlberg, 1886)
Species group 'c'
O. aenescens C. G. Thompson, 1869
O. spinifera (Leach, 1817)
Species group 'd'
O. coriacea van der Wulp, 1903

References

Hippoboscidae
Parasites of birds
Hippoboscoidea genera
Taxa named by William Elford Leach